Ninemile Creek or Nine Mile Creek may refer to:

Australia 

 Nine Mile Creek, Queensland, a locality in the Rockhampton Region

United States 

Ninemile Creek (Juneau, Alaska), a stream in Alaska
Ninemile Creek (Georgia), a stream in Georgia
Ninemile Creek (Belle Fourche River tributary), a stream in South Dakota
Ninemile Creek (Onondaga Lake tributary), a stream in New York
Nine Mile Creek (Minnesota River tributary), a stream in Minnesota
Nine Mile Creek (Utah), a creek in Nine Mile Canyon, tributary of the Green